Matchless Amplifiers is a Los Angeles-based company which designs and makes electric guitar amplifiers, specializing in class-A tube circuitry.

History 
Matchless Amplifiers was founded in 1989 by Mark Sampson and Rick Perotta. The company started in Perotta's home in Hollywood, California. Steve Goodale and Chris Perrotta were also key initial partners. The company saw great success in the early 1990's, meeting the demand for sonically consistent and structurally reliable tube amplifiers. Their flagship amp is the DC-30, an EL-83 amplifier based on the Vox AC30.

Due to the growing demand, the founders elected to become partners with the U.S. Music Corporation in January 1994. This merger was done to acquire much needed growth and capital. This merger lasted until October 1995 when Mark Sampson acquired Matchless without the other founding partners. Sampson stayed on with the company as president and C.E.O. until late 1999.

By the late 1990's, Matchless began to decline financially due to over-expansion and market declines. In 1999, Matchless filed for bankruptcy. Phil Jamison, a Matchless employee from 1992 to 1997, acquired the company in 2000 and has been the chief operating officer (COO) ever since.

Early "Sampson-Era" amplifiers fetch high prices on the after-market; however, Jamison states that current-production Matchless amplifiers are of higher quality than the early amplifiers and have more efficient circuit layouts. There are currently sixteen production amplifiers offered by Matchless.

Notes

External links 
Matchless Amplifiers official site
GigRig's interview with Matchless's Phil Jamison
Gold Records Custom Made
Royer Labs
Lock-it Guitar Straps
NAMM Oral History Interview with Mark Sampson

Guitar amplifier manufacturers
Audio equipment manufacturers of the United States